
Lac de Chésery is a lake in the municipality of Monthey, canton of Valais, Switzerland. It is located close to the French border, below the Pointe de Chésery.
The lake pictured is in France not the subject of this page.*

Chesery
Monthey